MV Queen of Chilliwack was a ferry owned by BC Ferries, built in Norway in 1978, then known as Bastø I. The ferry route she was assigned to was the Moss–Horten Ferry in the Oslofjord.

In 1991 Bastø I was bought by BC Ferries. She had to travel 35 days on the trip to British Columbia from Norway, via the Panama Canal. When the vessel arrived she first went to Point Hope Shipyard for a major overhaul for the Tsawwassen - Southern Gulf Islands ferry route in the Gulf of Georgia. She was then named Queen of Chilliwack. She later changed to the Earls Cove - Saltery Bay route.

In 1996 Queen of Chilliwack was taken out of service for another overhaul, this time the ferry was assigned to the new mid-coast route called the Discovery Coast Passage which goes through Queen Charlotte Sound. Queen of Chilliwack would first start from Port Hardy and begin her journey up to the small First Nations communities of Namu, Bella Bella, Shearwater, Ocean Falls, and Bella Coola. In the winter prior to 2009, Queen of Chilliwack maintained the Earls Cove - Saltery Bay route. While the MV Northern Expedition handles  the Port Hardy to Prince Rupert route. As of 2009 she has been replaced by the MV Malaspina Sky on the Earls Cove - Saltery Bay route.

In 2015 "Queen of Chilliwack" was sold to Goundar Shipping of Fiji reportedly for $1.8 million.

See also 
 List of ships built at Framnæs shipyard

References

External links 
 
  Photo of the Chilliwack

Ferries of Norway
Ships of BC Ferries
Ships built in Sandefjord
1978 ships